Milano Assicurazioni was an Italian financial services company based in Milan, Italy.

The company was particularly active in the insurance sector, where it underwrites life, property, casualty and marine cover.

In 1992 Roberto Pontremoli was appointed by Paolo Savona as extraordinary commissioner. In one year he resolved economic problems of the company.

The company was listed on the Borsa Italiana and was a constituent of the S&P/MIB index.

On 6 January 2014 the company merged with Unipol Assicurazioni and Premafin by incorporation in Fondiaria-Sai that was renamed to UnipolSai Assicurazioni S.P.A..

Companies based in Milan
Financial services companies established in 1825
1825 establishments in Italy
Defunct insurance companies of Italy
Financial services companies disestablished in 2014